Remember You is the eighteenth studio album by Japanese recording artist Ayumi Hamasaki. Preceded by seven singles released from 2020 to 2022, it also marks her first studio album release in the Reiwa era. 

To promote the release, Hamasaki named her New Year's Eve concerts after the album: Countdown Live 2022–2023 A: Remember You. Two concerts were held over December 30 and 31, with the latter date streamed through dTV. On December 28, it was announced that the song "(Not) Remember You" would be made available on January 1, 2023 as a pre-release album track on all streaming platforms. A second pre-release album track, "Just the Way You Are", was released on January 18 alongside a promotional clip featuring Kumamoto Pro-Wrestling, who is a member of the comedy duo Benishoga. After its release online, Japanese media widely covered the collaboration, praising the song as "a gentle, yet emotional ballad".

Background 
Remember You is an outlier in Hamasaki's standard release schedule from earlier in her career, being seven years after her last studio album Made in Japan. After a string of singles across 2020 and 2021, the singer commented on her official Instagram account on March 2, 2022 that she was "receiving many exciting demos" from multiple composers, seeming to confirm she was planning an album release. One of those demos was confirmed in the same post to be from Tetsuya Komuro, who would later be credited as the composer and arranger on her single "Mask". 

Hamasaki confirmed that she was working on her next studio album in April 2022, announcing it at the end of her Asia Tour: 24th Anniversary Special concert, with a tentative release date as "Fall 2022". However, it was delayed, with the singer attributing the change in release date to ongoing issues with writer's block. The new release date was confirmed to be January 25, 2023.

The album includes all of the singles that Hamasaki has released since 2020, including her cover of Yumi Matsutoya's "Haru yo, koi". These span from over the last two years, with the earliest single being "Ohia no Ki" - a track Hamasaki dedicated to her then-newborn son - which also served as her first single since the 2018 EP Trouble.

The singer spoke often of struggling with the creative process and burnout during the creation of the album, with this being the longest gap between studio album releases she has had in her career. This has also been referred to in public statements by the singer, such as anxiety surrounding being able to "do what Ayu would do" when deciding how to perform on-stage. It is also Hamasaki's first full album release since her 2017 announcement of having impaired hearing in her right ear, being fully deaf in her left ear since the 2000s.

Writing and production 
The seven singles released in anticipation of the album generally favored uptempo, dance-pop compositions - as showcased in "Dreamed a Dream", "Nonfiction", "Summer Again", and "Mask" - with "Ohia no Ki" being the only original ballad used as a single. The album marks Hajime Kato and Hisashi Koyama's first collaborations with her, along with the return of Kazuhito Kikuchi, who last worked with Hamasaki for her 2006 album Secret. While Yuta Nakano arranged the majority of the album, both Atsushi Sato and Takehito Shimizu were brought back as arrangers for "23rd Monster", having worked with the singer for her last two releases - Made in Japan, and Trouble. 

Lyrically, Hamasaki explores various subjects, with the overall themes being feelings of loneliness, dissonance, and self-doubt. "Dreamed a Dream" contrasts aggressive 90s-inspired beats with a contemplative set of lyrics; the singer openly reflects on her work, and the perceived limitations she has at this point in her career. This line of thinking is continued in the later-released "23rd Monster", Hamasaki also accusing herself of having grown complacent before naming herself as the "monster" the title refers to ("Doing only what you have to, choosing surrender rather than fight/You're also a 'monster'"). The song continues to address both herself and faceless detractors, the heavy pop-rock foundation of the song underscoring the conclusion of needing to take back control of her own career.

It could be said that both "Nonfiction" and "Summer Again" are societal commentaries on COVID-19, with the former song criticizing the spread of false news, and the latter being a call to "take back the summer" together after two years of pandemic isolation measures; while "Mask" portrays itself as a personal reflection on being faced with contrasting ideals and wants, Hamasaki wondering if to be shielded from something means being manipulated, or protected.

Hamasaki consistently posted online about writing and recording the album between different concert projects, such as between TA Summer Party 2022 dates, and during rehearsals for both the last date of Asia Tour 2021-2022 A: 23rd Monster and Countdown Live 2022–2023: Remember You. The creative process was noted to be rigorous, with Hamasaki at one point posting that "Just because a song is finished, doesn't mean it'll see the light of day", and "I wonder how many times I've created and destroyed things over the past year, and how many songs there will be when I'm done with all of them". Ultimately, while the initial announcement of the album listed 12 tracks, the final tracklist confirmed 14 tracks in total.

Artwork 
First unveiled on December 23, 2022, the photographer is credited as Masayuki Kamo, who also shot the cover visuals for her 21st Anniversary: Power of A^3 recorded release. The cover art of the album features Hamasaki in the Peninsula Suite of the Tokyo Peninsula Hotel, looking into the distance on all three covers, with a backdrop of the city nightscape visible in two versions. Notably, the Peninsula Hotel is where the singer commented often staying in while writing over the last two years.

Release 
Remember You was released on January 25, 2023. Six different formats were advertised, which include a CD, CD+DVD, CD+Blu-ray, and a double-disc edition—CD+2DVD+Goods, and a CD+2Blu-ray+Goods set. The latter edition of the album includes the singer's A-Nation Online 2020 performance stage, which notably showcased a live rendition of the 'despair trilogy'—"Vogue", "Far Away", and "Seasons". The final version of the album is a digital download.

The TeamAyu version of the album includes a 92 page photobook, described as a mix of a new photoshoot and off-shots from 2020 to 2022. The photoshoot is stated to include haute couture pieces commissioned specifically for Hamasaki.

Commercial performance 
Remember You debuted at number 6 on the Weekly Oricon Albums Chart, selling 11,317 copies. It had a peak of number 3 on its initial release date.

With Remember Yous performance, Hamasaki became the female artist with the most albums to reach the top 10—a total of 54. She had previously tied for first place with Seiko Matsuda.

The album was also successful throughout many parts of Asia. Upon release, the Taiwanese version of Remember You topped the G-Music East Asian Chart. The album spent 2 non-consecutive weeks at number 1 in Taiwan. Remember You also reached number 1 on the Japanese Album Chart in Signapore on KKBOX.

Track listing

Charts

Weekly charts

Monthly charts

References 

2023 albums
Avex Trax albums
Ayumi Hamasaki albums
Japanese-language albums